Nilesat 101 is an Egyptian owned geosynchronous communications satellite that was decommissioned in February 2013.

Launch 

Nilesat 101 was launched by an Ariane 4 rocket from Kourou, French Guiana on 28 April 1998 at 22:53:00 UTC by Arianespace. The satellite is powered by solar arrays, and the power is stored aboard batteries.

Mission 

The satellite was manufactured by the European company Matra Marconi Space (Astrium), and started official broadcasting on 1 June 1998 with a mission life of 12 years. At launch the spacecraft had a gross mass of 1,666 kg.

Orbit 

It was parked at the geostationary orbital position of 7° West together with its sister Satellite Nilesat 102 and carries 12 Ku band 100 W high power wide beam transponders of 33 MHz bandwidth to provide digital communications and terrestrial Direct to Home ((DTH)) TV, radio broadcasting, multimedia and data services for countries in North Africa, South Europe and the Middle East. The two satellites carry approximately 150 TV channels, with 100 of those originally coming from Nilesat 101, covering all the Middle East countries; north from Southern Europe to Central Africa, south, and east from Iran to the Atlantic Ocean, west. Nilesat 101 provided service to more than five million homes.

Operations 
Nilesat 101 was operated by The Egyptian satellite Co. Nilesat that was established in 1996 with the purpose of operating Egyptian satellites and their associated mission control center and ground stations. The two control centers are located in Cairo and Alexandria.

See also

 European Space Agency

References

External links
 Nilesat homepage
 European Space Agency homepage
 

Communications satellites in geostationary orbit
Spacecraft launched in 1998
First artificial satellites of a country
Satellites of Egypt
1998 in Egypt
Telecommunications in Egypt